Dušan Uhrin (born 5 February 1943) is a Czech and Slovak football coach and former player. He was the coach of Slovan Bratislava. Although he was born in the Nitra District in the Slovak part of Czechoslovakia, he has lived in Prague since the age of 16.

He coached the Czech Republic national football team at the 1996 UEFA European Championship, where the Czech Republic were runners up.  He also coached Kuwait between 1999 and 2002.

At club level Uhrin coached Czech clubs Sparta Prague, FC Hradec Králové, Rudá hvězda Cheb, Bohemians and Teplice, as well as Al-Nasr (Saudi Arabia), AIK (Sweden), AEL Limassol and APOEL FC (Cyprus), Maccabi Haifa FC (Israel).

Honours

As a Manager
Algerian Cup:
Winner (1): 1978
Cypriot Cup:
Winner (1): 1989
Czechoslovak First League:
Winner (2): 1990-91, 1992-93
Czechoslovak Football Cup:
Winner (1): 1992
UEFA European Championship:
Runner-up (1): 1996
Saudi Federation Cup:
Winner (1): 1998
Asian Cup Winners Cup:
Winner (1): 1998
Georgian League:
Winner (1): 2007-08

References

External links
 

Living people
1943 births
People from Nitra District
Sportspeople from the Nitra Region
Footballers from Prague
Czechoslovak footballers
Association football midfielders
FC Slavia Karlovy Vary players
Czechoslovak football managers
Czech football managers
Czechoslovak expatriate football managers
Czech expatriate football managers
UEFA Euro 1996 managers
1997 FIFA Confederations Cup managers
2000 AFC Asian Cup managers
AC Sparta Prague managers
CR Belouizdad managers
FC Hradec Králové managers
FK Hvězda Cheb managers
Bohemians 1905 managers
AEL Limassol managers
Czech Republic national football team managers
Al Nassr FC managers
Maccabi Haifa F.C. managers
Kuwait national football team managers
FK Teplice managers
AIK Fotboll managers
APOEL FC managers
FC Dinamo Tbilisi managers
ŠK Slovan Bratislava managers
Expatriate football managers in Algeria
Expatriate football managers in Cyprus
Expatriate football managers in Saudi Arabia
Expatriate football managers in Israel
Expatriate football managers in Kuwait
Expatriate football managers in Sweden
Expatriate football managers in Georgia (country)
Expatriate football managers in Slovakia
Czechoslovak expatriate sportspeople in Algeria
Czechoslovak expatriate sportspeople in Cyprus
Czech expatriate sportspeople in Cyprus
Czech expatriate sportspeople in Sweden
Czech expatriate sportspeople in Israel
Czech expatriate sportspeople in Saudi Arabia
Czech expatriate sportspeople in Slovakia
Czech expatriate sportspeople in Georgia (country)
Czech expatriate sportspeople in Kuwait